Strada Education Network is a non-profit corporation which assists students into post-secondary education by providing financial support and other help. USA Funds links colleges, universities, proprietary schools, private lenders, students and parents to promote financial access to higher learning. The organization is formerly known as United Student Aid Funds or USA Funds. Strada's headquarters is in Indianapolis, Indiana.

History
Established by Richard Cornuelle in Indianapolis in 1960 to help families finance rising college costs, USA Funds has grown to become the nation's largest guarantor of loans made under the Federal Family Education Loan Program (FFELP), the main federal source of financial aid for higher education. During the past 44 years, the USA Funds guarantee has covered just under $115.5 billion in financial aid for higher education, for 13.6 million students. The corporation is affiliated with regional non-profit student loan guarantors, including SMS Hawaii (for Hawaii) and the Northwest Education Loan Association (NELA) (for Idaho and Washington). USA Funds guarantees education loans nationwide, and is also the designated guarantor of federal education loans in eight states: Arizona, Hawaii and the Pacific Islands, Indiana, Kansas, Maryland, Mississippi, Nevada and Wyoming. The Thurgood Marshall College Fund, aiding public historically black colleges and universities is an affiliate of the Strada Education Network.

In 2017, USA Funds was rebranded as Strada Education Network.

Affiliation with Sallie Mae
USA Funds contracts with affiliates of Sallie Mae, the largest guarantor-servicing organization, to deliver some of the services necessary to support USA Funds' guarantee.

Before July 31, 2000, USA Funds was an affiliate of USA Group. USA Funds contracted with other USA Group affiliates to these lenders contract with Sallie Mae for servicing and loan acquisition; others have no contractual relationships with Sallie Mae. Post-secondary institutions and their students are free to choose the lenders with which they wish to work while using the USA Funds guarantee.

References

External links 
 Strada Education Network website

Student financial aid in the United States
Education finance in the United States
1960 establishments in Indiana
Financial services companies established in 1960